Carl Daniel von Haartman (5 May 1792 – 15 August 1877) was a Finnish physician (gynaecologist).

Von Haartman was born in Turku, Finland, then part of the Kingdom of Sweden. His father, Gabriel Erik von Haartman (1757–1815), was a physician and statesman. Von Haartman's mother, Fredrika Lovisa von Mell, was the daughter of Lars Henrik von Mell.

Von Haartman served as general director for the Finnish Medicinal Government Agency 1833–1855. 

In the 1840s, he published the racially biased Försök att bestämma den genuina racen af de i Finland boende folk, som tala finska ("Acta Societatis scientiarum Fennicæ", in 1845).

References 

1792 births
1877 deaths
Finnish physicians
Finnish gynaecologists
Swedish-speaking Finns
19th-century Finnish people
People from Turku